The Meaning of Night is a painting by the Belgian Surrealist René Magritte. Painted in 1927, it is an oil painting on canvas with dimensions 139 cm by 105 cm and is in the Menil Collection, Houston.

References 

1927 paintings
Paintings by René Magritte
Water in art